David Watkin BSC (23 March 1925 – 19 February 2008) was an English cinematographer, an innovator who was among the first directors of photography to experiment heavily with the usage of bounce light as a soft light source. He worked with such film directors as Richard Lester, Peter Brook, Tony Richardson, Mike Nichols, Ken Russell, Franco Zeffirelli, Sidney Lumet and Sydney Pollack.

In 1985, Watkin won the Academy Award for Best Cinematography for his work on Out of Africa. He received lifetime achievement awards in 2004 from the British Society of Cinematographers and the cinematographic-centric Camerimage Film Festival in Łódź, Poland.

In Chariots of Fire, he "helped create one of the most memorable images of 1980s cinema: the opening sequence in which a huddle of young male athletes pounds along the water's edge on a beach" to the film's theme music by Vangelis.

Early life and career
Watkin was born in Margate, Kent, England, the fourth and youngest son of a Roman Catholic solicitor father and homemaker mother, and grew up within a well-to-do upper-middle class household. He gained an early enthusiasm for European classical music, which was left to be satisfied only as a passive listener when his father rejected his request for a piano and lessons; Watkin always contended that he would rather have been a professional musician than a cinematographer.

After a brief period in the Army during World War II, Watkin started work at the Southern Railway Film Unit in 1948 as a camera assistant. After the unit was absorbed into British Transport Films in 1950, he eventually climbed the ranks up to director of photography at BTF before going off to work freelance in commercials around 1960.

Before working in feature films "as a fully fledged cinematographer", he shot the title sequence of the James Bond film, Goldfinger (1964) for Robert Brownjohn.

Work with Richard Lester
It was on a commercial shoot that he met Richard Lester, who hired him for his feature film, The Knack …and How to Get It (1965) which won the Palme d'Or at Cannes. The two men subsequently worked together on Help! (1965), How I Won the War (1967), The Bed-Sitting Room (1969), The Three Musketeers (1973), The Four Musketeers (1974), Robin and Marian (1976) and Cuba (1979).

Watkin's casual approach
He was noted for his very casual approach; when asked when he first developed a passion for photography, he answered that he hadn't yet (his main passions being classical music and books). However, filmmaking did have an attraction because, as he said, "I knew filmmakers didn't have to wear a suit".

He also has a rather famous habit of sleeping on-set in between lighting setups, because "it's the only thing you can do on-set which doesn't make you more tired". This habit was humorously referenced in Night Falls on Manhattan (1996), which he shot, where he has a brief cameo towards the beginning as a sleeping judge. In the case of the film of Marat/Sade (1967), problems with a tight shooting schedule and restricted set space were innovatively resolved through the use of one single lighting set-up for the entirety of the film – a translucent wall lit by twenty-six 10 kW lamps as the sole source of light.

Style and technique
He was generally recognised for the "painterly qualities" in his work with some critics comparing him with Vermeer, the Dutch artist "who often illuminated his subjects with light refracted through windows".

In Out of Africa he broke with tradition and "used fast film for exteriors and slow film for night and interiors. This typically maverick move gave Sydney Pollack's film a lush, soft quality that matched its romantic mood".

Conception of a new lighting technique
Watkin also conceived the idea for a new light which would tackle the problem of light falloff during night shoots. Because of the inverse square law, light from even moderately strong sources starts to fall off fairly quickly as the subject walks away from the light source. Therefore, films shooting at night had the problem of trying to hide light sources in places which would be out of shot but maintain a fairly constant level of illumination over any amount of distance (and thus not indicate a large lamp as a light source). But this time-consuming approach created problems with multiple shadows of divergent angles.

Due to the long distance between the light and the actors and the high luminescence of this light array, the actors could walk across long distances without the intensity of the light hitting them seeming to vary. Subsequently, the array was named the "Wendy-light" in his honour – Watkin, who was gay, used the camp name "Wendy".

Personal life
David Watkin led a relatively quiet life in his adopted home town of Brighton, East Sussex, when he wasn't working on a "picture". He was highly regarded as a cultured and intellectual man, with an outrageously irreverent sense of humour, and a great love of classical music and literature. He had a personal library of mostly First Edition 18th Century literature.

He was openly gay.

Death
David Watkin died, aged 82, at his home in Sussex Mews, Brighton on 19 February 2008, having been diagnosed with prostate cancer just six months previously.

Publications
His autobiographies, Why Is There Only One Word for Thesaurus?, first published in 1998 and the second volume, Was Clara Schumann a Fag Hag?, published in 2008, by Scrutineer Publishing, were both designed by his good friend the artist and designer Rachael Adams.

Awards and honours

Selected filmography

References

External links

Internet Encyclopedia of Cinematographers
Obituary

1925 births
2008 deaths
Best Cinematographer Academy Award winners
Best Cinematography BAFTA Award winners
English cinematographers
People from Brighton
People from Margate
Deaths from prostate cancer
Deaths from cancer in England
British Army personnel of World War II
English LGBT people